Simone Bauer (born 12 November 1973) is a German fencer. She competed in the women's individual foil event at the 2004 Summer Olympics.

Simone Bauer attended the Kaufmännische Schule Tauberbischofsheim and fought for the Fencing-Club Tauberbischofsheim.

Success
 1993 World Fencing Championships, foil, team
 1999 World Fencing Championships, foil, team
 1989 Cadet World Fencing Championships, foil, individual
 1990 Cadet World Fencing Championships, foil, individual
 1991 Junior World Fencing Championships, foil, individual
 1993 World Fencing Championships, foil, individual

References

External links
 

1973 births
Living people
German female fencers
Olympic fencers of Germany
Fencers at the 2004 Summer Olympics
People from Wertheim am Main
Sportspeople from Stuttgart (region)